The 2003–04 OB I bajnokság season was the 67th season of the OB I bajnokság, the top level of ice hockey in Hungary. Six teams participated in the league, and Alba Volan Szekesfehervar won the championship.

First round

Second round

Group I

Group II

Playoffs

3rd place 
 Ferencvárosi TC - Újpesti TE 2:0 (7:2, 5:3)

Final 
 Alba Volán Székesfehérvár - Dunaújvárosi AC 4:1 (3:1, 1:0, 2:3 SO, 6:0, 3:2 SO)

External links
 Season on hockeyarchives.info

OB I bajnoksag seasons
Hun
OB